My Only Fascination is a studio album by Greek singer Demis Roussos, released in 1974 on Philips Records.

Commercial performance 
The album reached no. 39 in the UK and no. 6 in Norway.

Track listing

Charts

Certifications

References

External links 
 Demis Roussos – My Only Fascination at Discogs
 Demis Roussos – My Only Fascination (Vinyl, LP, Album) at Discogs

1974 albums
Demis Roussos albums
Philips Records albums